The Dutch Albums Chart ranks the best-performing albums in the Netherlands, as compiled by GfK Dutch Charts.

References 

Number one albums
Netherlands
Lists of number-one albums in the Netherlands